Julie Kuliecza (born November 4, 1980) is an American professional racing cyclist, who currently rides for UCI Women's Team .

See also
 List of 2015 UCI Women's Teams and riders

References

External links
 

1980 births
Living people
American female cyclists
People from Alexandria, Virginia
21st-century American women